Perumalsamy Namperumalsamy is an Indian ophthalmologist who specializes in diabetic retinopathy. He is also a retina-vitreous expert. Namperumalsamy is currently the chairman Emeritus of Aravind Eye Hospital, Madurai. He is known for bringing assembly-line efficiency to eye surgery. In 2010, TIME magazine named Namperumalsamy one of the 100 most influential people in the world.

Under the chairmanship of Namperumalsamy, Aravind Eye Hospital, received the 2010 Conrad N. Hilton Humanitarian Prize, which is awarded annually to an organization that does extraordinary work to alleviate human suffering.

Career
A postgraduate fellow of the University of Illinois, Chicago, Namperumalsamy started the India's first Low Vision Aid Centre at the Government Rajaji Hospital in Madurai in 1971. He is currently the chairman of Aravind Eye Hospital.

Namperumalsamy, an elected fellow of the National Academy of Medical Sciences, is a recipient of Padma Shri Award from the Government of India.
He also served as the Co-investigator on a  research  Project  “Clinical and Laboratory Studies on  Eales  Disease”  in  collaboration  with National Eye Institute,  Washington,  United States and Indian Council of Medical Research and Madurai Kamaraj University.

References

External links

The unstoppable Indian Dr P Namperumalsamy

Living people
Indian ophthalmologists
Medical doctors from Tamil Nadu
Recipients of the Padma Shri in medicine
Fellows of the National Academy of Medical Sciences
20th-century Indian medical doctors
Year of birth missing (living people)
20th-century surgeons